Pegaeophyton is a plant genus in the family Brassicaceae.

Species
Pegaeophyton angustiseptatum Al-Shehbaz, T.Y. Cheo, L.L. Lu & G. Yang
Pegaeophyton minutum H. Hara
Pegaeophyton nepalense Al-Shehbaz, Arai & H. Ohba
Pegaeophyton purii (D.S.Rawat, L.R.Dangwal & R.D. Gaur) Al-Shehbaz
Pegaeophyton scapiflorum (Hook.f. & Thomson) C.Marquand & Airy Shaw
Pegaeophyton sulphureum Al-Shehbaz
Pegaeophyton watsonii Al-Shehbaz

References

Brassicaceae
Brassicaceae genera
Taxa named by Heinrich von Handel-Mazzetti